Farewell, My Beautiful Lady  is a 1954 Italian historical melodrama film directed by Fernando Cerchio and starring Gino Cervi, Alba Arnova and Armando Francioli. It presents a love triangle between a Colonel of the Bersaglieri, his wife and his young student set against the backdrop of Italy's entry into the First World War in 1915.

Cast
 Gino Cervi as Conte Riccardo Salluzzo 
 Alba Arnova as Cristina 
 Armando Francioli as Guido 
 Laura Gore as Clara 
 Silvio Bagolini as Ercole 
 Maria Zanoli as La governante 
 Luigi Pavese as Giuseppe 
 Franco Fabrizi as Marco 
 Giacomo Rondinella as himself 
 Sergio Bergonzelli as The Student
 Graziella De Roc as Cristina's Maidservant

References

Bibliography 
 Chiti, Roberto & Poppi, Roberto. Dizionario del cinema italiano: Dal 1945 al 1959. Gremese Editore, 1991.

External links 
 

1954 films
1950s historical drama films
Italian historical drama films
1950s Italian-language films
Films directed by Fernando Cerchio
Films set in the 1910s
Italian World War I films
1954 drama films
Italian black-and-white films
Melodrama films
1950s Italian films